The 2011 Rally Australia was the 21st Rally Australia and the tenth round of the 2011 World Rally Championship season. The rally took place over 8–11 September, and was based in Coffs Harbour, a coastal city in the New South Wales state of Australia. The rally was also the fifth round of the Production World Rally Championship. Rally Australia returned to the WRC calendar after a year's hiatus, and after demonstrations marred the 2009 running of the rally, held north of Coffs Harbour in the Northern Rivers area. Residents' concerns for the event meant that the rally was moved for the foreseeable future to Coffs Harbour.

Ford World Rally Team's Mikko Hirvonen took his third successive Rally Australia victory, after team-mate Jari-Matti Latvala slowed tactically on the penultimate stage, in order to aid Hirvonen's chances for the drivers' championship title. The Ford drivers had moved into the top two placings on the opening day of the rally after Citroën's Sébastien Loeb and Sébastien Ogier both had to retire from the day's proceedings and return to the rally the following day under the SupeRally regulations. Loeb recovered to score a tenth-place finish with the Power Stage victory, to extend his championship by four points over Ogier, who slowed on the last two stages to drop from eighth to eleventh behind Loeb.

Petter Solberg finished third behind the Ford pairing, 44.8 seconds in arrears, but finished over seven minutes clear of the fourth-placed driver Matthew Wilson, who matched his career-best placing from Rally Japan in 2007. Khalid Al Qassimi scored a career-best fifth place, ahead of a quartet of PWRC competitors. Hayden Paddon was the best of the PWRC competitors with sixth place overall, securing his fourth PWRC victory in succession, and the championship title as Martin Semerád – who elected not to compete at the event – could only tie Paddon on points and lose on countback. Michał Kościuszko, Oleksandr Saliuk, Jr. and Benito Guerra also scored overall championship points by finishing in the top ten.

Results

Event standings

Special stages

Power stage
The "Power stage" was a live, televised  stage at the end of the rally, held in Clarence.

Standings after the race

Drivers' Championship standings

Constructors' Championship standings

 Bold Text indicates World Champion.
 Note: Only the top five positions are included for both sets of standings.

References

External links 

 Results at eWRC.com

Australia
Rally
Rally Australia